Zaytsevsky is a rural locality (a settlement) in Sevsky District, Bryansk Oblast, Russia. The population was 9 as of 2010. There is 1 street.

Geography 
Zaytsevsky is located 51 km southeast of Sevsk (the district's administrative centre) by road. Dobrovodye is the nearest rural locality.

References 

Rural localities in Sevsky District